Michael Fielding (born 23 January 1982) is a British comedian and actor, known for his role as Naboo in the British surreal comedy The Mighty Boosh. He was born in Westminster, London, England and brought up in Mitcham, Southwest London. He plays Smooth, the butler, in Noel Fielding's Luxury Comedy, as well as other roles such as Doo-Rag.

Career
Michael Fielding appeared on his elder brother Noel Fielding and Julian Barratt's show, The Mighty Boosh. Michael starred in all three series as well as live tours including The Mighty Boosh Live and the Future Sailors Tour. He performs as Naboo the Enigma, as well as other minor characters. More recently, he starred in Noel Fielding's Luxury Comedy.

The Mighty Boosh
Fielding is best known for playing Naboo the Enigma, the shaman on The Mighty Boosh, co-written by and co-starring his elder brother, Noel Fielding. He became part of The Mighty Boosh when he accompanied Noel to a show in Australia. Michael and his best friend then decided to live in Australia following the tour. In an audio commentary on the DVD release of the first season of The Mighty Boosh, Noel commented that his brother and friend only lived there for a year but they 'had the time of their lives'. His character is often seen with a hookah pipe and makes a few drug references throughout the series. Noel said in an interview with Jonathan Ross that the abstract name of the show came about from one of Michael's Portuguese friends who described his hair as being like a "mighty bush", owing to Michael's curly hairstyle as a child. Michael has since confirmed his brother's story about The Mighty Boosh name, but revealed that his friend was actually Spanish.

Noel Fielding's Luxury Comedy

Michael Fielding is also known for his roles in Noel Fielding's Luxury Comedy. He played the main character Smooth, Noel's purple anteater-like butler. He also played the minor character Doo Rag.

References

External links

 Interview Jan 2009 – www.vexedmag.com
 Interview Jan 2012 – Electric Banana

1981 births
Living people
English people of French descent
English male television actors
English male comedians
British surrealist artists
The Mighty Boosh